SuperM is the eponymous debut extended play (EP) by South Korean supergroup SuperM. It was released on October 4, 2019 by SM Entertainment, Capitol Records and Dreamus. The CD version of the EP has eight different versions: one individual edition for each member and a "united" version. 

The EP debuted at the top spot of the United States' Billboard 200 albums chart, becoming the first Korean act to top the chart with their debut release.

Background and release 
On August 7, 2019, Capitol Music Group chairman Steve Barnett and SM Entertainment founder Lee Soo-man announced SuperM's debut at Capitol Congress. A teaser revealed the members of the group, with each having performance, vocal, and rap abilities. 

On August 28, the instrumental of one of the album's songs, "I Can't Stand the Rain", was released. SM Entertainment began releasing teasers and concept videos on September 1 through SuperM's official social media accounts. 

The album and its title track's music video were released on October 4 both digitally and physically.

Promotion 
SuperM held their debut concert at the Capitol Records Building in Los Angeles on October 5, and made their television debut on The Ellen DeGeneres Show on October 9. The group then started to embark on their first tour, We Are the Future Live, in November 2019. The last leg of the tour which included a Tokyo Dome concert on April 23, was indefinitely postponed due to the COVID-19 pandemic.

Commercial performance
SuperM debuted at number one on the US Billboard 200 by the end of its first week of release with 168,000 album-equivalent units (of which 164,000 were in album sales), earning the group their record as the first Korean act to hit number one with a debut album. The EP earned the top spot on the Billboard World Albums Chart and remained number one for the next eight consecutive weeks. 

Following the EP release, the group topped Billboards Artist 100 chart as the top musical act in the US for the week ending 19 October, making the group the second K-pop act to ever lead the chart, following BTS. The EP placed itself on the eleventh spot with 31,000 units for the following week and continued to chart on the Billboard 200 for the next six weeks (eight weeks in total).

In South Korea, the EP debuted at the third spot of the Gaon Weekly Albums Chart and sold 153,590 copies in just one day of tracking.

Track listing

Charts

Weekly charts

Year-end charts

Accolades

Release history

See also
 List of K-pop albums on the Billboard charts
 List of K-pop songs on the Billboard charts
 List of Billboard 200 number-one albums of 2019

References

2019 debut EPs
Korean-language EPs
SM Entertainment EPs
Capitol Records EPs
Caroline Records EPs
IRiver EPs
Albums produced by Lee Soo-man
SuperM albums